Statistics of Emperor's Cup in the 1931 season.

Overview
It was contested by 7 teams, and Imperial University of Tokyo LB won the championship.

Results

Quarterfinals
Kwansei Gakuin University 1–2 Imperial University of Tokyo LB
Hakodate Shukyu-dan 0–2 Nagoya Shukyu-dan
Toyama Shihan Club 1–5 Kobun Junior High School

Semifinals
II School Club 0–2 Imperial University of Tokyo LB
Nagoya Shukyu-dan 1–3 Kobun Junior High School

Final

Imperial University of Tokyo LB 5–1 Kobun Junior High School
Imperial University of Tokyo LB won the championship.

References
 NHK

Emperor's Cup
1931 in Japanese football